Sir Bryan Thwaites, FIMA, FRSA (born 6 December 1923) is an English applied mathematician, educationalist and administrator.

Early life
Bryan Thwaites was born on 6 December 1923, the eldest son of Ernest and Dorothy Thwaites. He was educated at Dulwich College, from 1936–1940, and, thereafter, at Winchester College, aided in both colleges by scholarships. He was graduated with an MA from Clare College, Cambridge University, in 1944, gaining a First in the Maths Tripos. He received his doctorate (Ph.D.) from London University.

Career

Early career
Thwaites' first appointment, on graduation, was as a Science Officer at the National Physical Laboratory (NPL), Teddington (1944–1947).

He then moved to the Department of Aeronautics at the Imperial College of Science (1947–1951), where he made an early impression: his Thwaites Flap being used to assist aeronautical tests. At this time Thwaites also became an AFRAeS.

Schoolmaster
In 1951 he returned to his old school, Winchester College, as an Assistant Master, teaching mathematics (1951–1959) and remained in secondary education for most of the 1950s.

Thwaites was also commissioned into the Royal Air Force Volunteer Reserve during this period, as a pilot officer in the Training Branch [RAFVR(T)] [1952–1958]. This was largely to assist with the command of the College cadet-force. Thwaites resigned his commission in 1958, as he prepared to take up his new appointments.

Professor
In 1961 Dr. Thwaites was appointed Professor of Theoretical Mechanics at the new University of Southampton (1961–1965).

On taking up his new post, Prof. Thwaites hosted a conference addressing the disconnect between the teaching of mathematics and the need for professional mathematicians in industry and academia: the result was the School Mathematics Project (SMP). At a meeting in Winchester, three public-school maths. teachers met with Thwaites to devise a new curriculum: Martyn Cundy (1913–2005) Sherborne School, Tom Jones Winchester College and Douglas Quadling (OBE) Marlborough College. T. D. Morris of Charterhouse School joined the group soon after. The representatives of Charterhouse, Marlborough, Sherborne and Winchester were then joined by Battersea Grammar School (A. J. Penfold), Exeter School (D. J. Holding), Holloway School (D. E. Mansfield) and Winchester County High School for Girls (WCHS) (J. E. Harris) and these eight schools initiated the SMP. Within a year the team had drawn up materials for the 'modern mathematics', ready for the new academic year in September 1962. From July 1964 three examination boards offered the new syllabus for the G.C.E. The SMP began as a research project but was then formalised as a charitable trust: Prof. Thwaites was the founding Director.

Taking another approach to further the development of mathematics, Thwaites co-founded, in 1964, the Institute of Mathematics and its Applications (IMA), alongside Professor (Sir) James Lighthill; he became a Fellow (FIMA) of the institute. In 1990, IMA received its Charter and was therefore able to award the title of Chartered Mathematician (CMath) to practising mathematicians, as part of the professionalisation of the occupation.

Principal
In 1965, Professor Thwaites was appointed Principal of Westfield College [1965–1984], a newly co-educational college of London University, based in Hampstead. He held the post for seventeen years, retiring from the post shortly before the college merged with Queen Mary College.

In 1969, Professor Thwaites was also appointed the Professor of Geometry [1969–1972] at Gresham College, a role that is largely an honorific.

Administrator
Thwaites developed an interest in medical administration, accepting a number of appointments over the years: he was Chairman of the Northwick Park Hospital Management Committee and a member of the Council of the Middlesex Hospital Board.

From 1982 to 1988, Thwaites was Chairman of Wessex Regional Health Authority. A 1993 report revealed that in 1986, Thwaites came under intense pressure to award a contract to Arthur Andersen. Patrick Jenkin was registered as a lobbyist for Andersen, and had been the man who appointed Thwaites to the post, when Jenkin was Secretary of State. Nevertheless, Thwaites was knighted in the New Year's Honours list of 1986, for his services to education and medicine. Jenkin was awarded a peerage in 1987. The friendship was briefly cemented by the marriage – later dissolved – in 1990, of Thwaites' son to Jenkin's daughter.

Other initiatives

In 1983, Thwaites co-founded the charity Education 2000, with Christopher Wysock-Wright.

Philanthropy
In later life, Sir Bryan sought to downsize and divest himself of his assets to serve good causes. In 2007, he donated an organ built for his London apartment to his old school Dulwich College. In 2019, he attempted to leave a bequest, totalling a million pounds, to his two secondary schools, on condition that it was used to benefit 'white working-class poor (males)'; the schools felt unable to accept the offer in light of anti-discrimination laws.

Personal life
Bryan Thwaites married Katharine Mary (Kate) in 1948; Lady Thwaites died in 1991. They have six children.
As a widower, Sir Bryan owned an apartment in the Albany, Piccadilly for a number of years.

Publications

References

1923 births
20th-century British mathematicians
Academics of the University of Southampton
Alumni of Clare College, Cambridge
Knights Bachelor
Living people
People educated at Dulwich College
People educated at Winchester College
Scientists of the National Physical Laboratory (United Kingdom)
Principals of Westfield College
Royal Air Force officers